Yellowknife Fire Division is a composite department and is located in Yellowknife, Northwest Territories, Canada with full-time and paid on call (POC) firefighters. The department was established in February, 1943. Their staff consists of 32 full-time and 15 on-call paid members, composed of a Fire Chief, 3 Deputy Chiefs, 1 administrative coordinator, 4 lieutenants and 28 firefighters. They operate on a four platoon system that consists of seven staff each and on-call personnel as required.

In 2016 the department responded to 4683 calls. The services provided incorporate public education initiatives, fire inspections, preplanning, fire suppression, emergency medical response and additional specialized services in auto extrication, hazmat, confined space, water/ice rescue. The Fire Department provides important emergency services to the citizens of Yellowknife and the surrounding area.

Recruitment selection process
A criminal record search (obtained from RCMP)
A driver's abstract (obtained from Driver and Vehicle Licensing located at 5003-49th Street)
An application completed in full including three references.
Department standard physical fitness test.

The current Fire Chief is John Fredericks.
Deputy Chief Safety and Training is Gerta Groothuizen.
Deputy Chief Operations is Craig McLean.
Deputy Chief Life Safety and Prevention is Darren Kuhn.

References

External links
Fire Division

Fire departments in the Northwest Territories
Buildings and structures in Yellowknife